The 2022 African Artistic Gymnastics Championships was the 16th iteration of the event and took place on July 8–11 in Cairo, Egypt.

Medal winners

Senior

Junior

Medal table

Combined

Men

Women

World Championship berths 
The event served as qualification for the 2022 World Championships.  Egypt earned a team berth for both men's and women's artistic gymnastics.  The top two men not part of a team earned an individual berth (max 2 per country): Hillal Metidji of Algeria and Abderrazak Nasser of Morocco.  The top four women not part of a team earned an individual berth (max 2 per country): Caitlin Rooskrantz and Naveen Daries of South Africa and Fatima Zohra Boukhatem and Lahna Salem of Algeria.

Participating nations 

  (15)
  (4)
  (20)
  (17)
  (18)
  (4)
  (1)

References

Africa
International sports competitions hosted by Egypt
African Artistic Gymnastics Championships
African Artistic Gymnastics Championships
African Artistic Gymnastics Championships